Vocea Basarabiei was one of the organized anti-Soviet groups in Bessarabia.

Notable members
Victor Zâmbrea

Bibliography
 Mitru Ghiţiu, Unele aspecte din mişcarea de rezistenţă antisovietică în Basarabia postbelică, Analele Sighet 2, Instaurarea comunismului - între rezistenţă şi represiune, Fundaţia Academia Civică, 1995
 Elena Postică, Rezistena antisovietică în Basarabia.1944-1950, Chişinău, 1997,
 Valeriu Pasat, Trudnâe straniţî istorii Moldovî. 1940-1950 [Documente] (Pages difficiles d'histoire de la Moldavie), Moscova, Ed. Terra, 1994,

Anti-communism in Moldova
Anti-communist organizations
Clandestine groups
Moldavian Soviet Socialist Republic
Organizations established in 1945
Paramilitary organizations based in the Soviet Union